Massimo Renon (born 1970) is an Italian businessman and CEO of the Benetton Group since March 2020.

Biography 
Renon studied at the Bologna University where he graduated in political science and business management.

Renon started his career at Giacomelli Sport where he managed retail development. In 2000, he joined the luxury eyewear manufacturer Luxottica, where he served as regional manager, wholesale coordinator, and then Director of Eastern Europe. In 2010, he joined the Ferrari group as commercial and customer service director, but shortly thereafter returned to the eyewear sector by working with the Safilo Group in 2012 as head of the EMEA region.  In 2017, he became CEO of the eyewear manufacturer Marcolin as worldwide commercial general manager when the Marcolin created a joint-venture with LVMH.

In March 2020, he was named CEO of the Benetton Group.

Personal life 
Massimo Renon is father of Jacopo.

References 

Living people
1970 births
Bocconi University alumni
21st-century Italian businesspeople
Italian businesspeople in fashion
Italian chief executives